William Gary Lamberth (born December 5, 1977) is an American politician. He serves as a Republican member of the Tennessee House of Representatives for the forty-fourth district, encompassing parts of Sumner County, Tennessee.

Biography

Early life
He was born on December 5, 1977 in Bowling Green, Kentucky. He is a fifth generation resident of Sumner County, Tennessee, and grew up on a farm in Tennessee. He attended high school in Portland, Tennessee. He graduated from the University of Tennessee in Knoxville, Tennessee in 2001 and received a J.D. from the William & Mary School of Law in Williamsburg, Virginia in 2004, where he was elected President of the Student Bar Association.

Career
He was an Assistant District Attorney for Sumner County. He now practices law as a private attorney in Gallatin, Tennessee.

He was elected as state representative for the forty-fourth district Tennessee in 2012, replacing Democratic representative Mike McDonald.

He is former president of the Rotary Club of Gallatin, Tennessee and the Sumner County Bar Association, and former treasurer of the Republican Party of Sumner County. He is also Chairman of the Portland Community Education Foundation, table host and donor to the Cumberland Crisis Pregnancy Center in Gallatin. He also donates to the Middle Tennessee Mission Outreach and regularly goes on Christian missions to Honduras and other regions of the world that are in need of humanitarian relief efforts.

Controversial Legislation
In 2022, after accepting over $50,000 in campaign donations from Jack Daniel’s and other alcohol suppliers, multiple detention facility operators and various pharmaceutical companies, Lamberth embarked on a personal crusade  to ban all forms of cannabis in Tennessee containing greater than .3% THC. This effort to ban came in spite of overwhelming public support of cannabis legalization, federal legality of non-delta 9 THC  and a clear position from the FDA and USDA  that delta 8 THC is not a controlled substance.

On February 14, 2023, in the Criminal Justice Subcommittee where he serves as a member, Lamberth was questioning witness Abby Rubenfeld on a bill that would criminalize drag queens for performing in front of children. Rubenfeld was explaining that any obscene performances were already illegal according to  Tennessee law that already exists and that this legislation serves as nothing but prejudicial to the LGBTQ+ community. Lamberth quickly shut her down, citing her lackluster credentials and absence of a logical argument against the bill.

Lamberth is well known for his criticisms towards the LGBTQ+ community, supporting bills to criminalize doctors providing transgender-affirming treatment to youth, requiring transgender people to use the appropriate public restrooms, and requiring trangender athletes to compete in their appropriately gendered collegiate.

Personal life
He is married to Lauren Schmidt Lamberth, and has two children, Allison and Pierce. He is a Baptist. He lives in Cottontown, Tennessee with his family.

References

1977 births
21st-century American politicians
Living people
Republican Party members of the Tennessee House of Representatives
People from Sumner County, Tennessee
Politicians from Bowling Green, Kentucky
University of Tennessee alumni
William & Mary Law School alumni